Pétur Arnþórsson (born 8 May 1965) is a retired Icelandic football midfielder.

References

1965 births
Living people
Petur Arnthorsson
Petur Arnthorsson
Viking FK players
Petur Arnthorsson
Petur Arnthorsson
Association football midfielders
Petur Arnthorsson
Expatriate footballers in Norway
Petur Arnthorsson
Eliteserien players
Petur Arnthorsson